The Police (Detention and Bail) Act 2011 (c. 9) is an Act of the Parliament of the United Kingdom that amends those sections of the Police and Criminal Evidence Act 1984 relating to the detention of criminal suspects by police forces in England and Wales.

The emergency nature of the Act meant it completed its parliamentary passage at a significantly expedited speed, being introduced to the House of Commons on 5 July and completing its stages just two days later, before being passed by the House of Lords and receiving Royal Assent on 12 July. 

The legislation was in response to the decision of McCombe J in R (on the application of the Chief Constable of Greater Manchester Police) v Salford Magistrates' Court and Paul Hookway. Home Secretary Theresa May called the ruling one of "great concern".

The Act had retrospective effect, a decision supported by Liberty. In debate in the House of Commons, this was supported by all sides, on the grounds that the mistaken interpretation was the one intended by Parliament and relied on by police for the last 25 years; allowing the correct interpretation to stand would jeopardize tens of thousands of ongoing investigations and a vast number of historic convictions.

Notes

English criminal law
Law enforcement in England and Wales
Codes of criminal procedure
United Kingdom Acts of Parliament 2011
Bail